The World Federalist Movement advocates strong democratic institutions adhering to the principles of subsidiarity, solidarity and democracy.

The movement formed in the 1930s and 1940s by citizens groups concerned that the structure of the new United Nations was too similar to the League of Nations which had failed to prevent World War II.

History
In the aftermath of World Wars I and II, activists formed organizations with the intention of creating a new international system that could prevent another global war.

The first world federalist organization was founded in 1937 by two famous feminists, pacifists, and female suffragists: Rosika Schwimmer and Lola Maverick Lloyd. In 1938, the Federal Union was organized in the United Kingdom. In the U.S., Federal Union (now: Association to Unite the Democracies) was established in 1939 calling for a federation of the Atlantic democracies. The Swiss Internationale Bewegung der Weltföderalisten-Schweiz
was created in Geneva in 1940. During World War II, anti-fascist resistance movements shared clandestinely circulated copies of Altiero Spinelli's plan for European federation and global federation. Spinelli later became one of the founding fathers of the European Union. In 1945, the Committee to Frame a World Constitution convened at the University of Chicago and drafted a Constitution for the World. In 1947, five small world federalist organizations came together in Asheville, North Carolina and agreed to merge as the United World Federalists.

These five groups had, in the previous year, met with representatives of fifteen others in Bern and Hertenstein (Weggis) to discuss creating a worldwide federalist organization. It was one year later, in August 1947, in Montreux, that more than 51 organizations from 24 countries came together at the Conference of the World Movement for World Federal Government (WMFWG). The Conference concluded with the Montreux Declaration.

By its second congress in 1948 in Luxembourg, the Movement consisted of 150,000 members of 19 nationalities and 50 member and affiliated organizations. The 350 participants in the Congress laid the groundwork for an association of parliamentarians for world government, which came into being in 1951.

Federalists had hoped that the anticipated UN review conference (under Article 109 of the UN Charter) in 1955 would move the UN further in the direction of a world federal system. Around 1965, the Movement had established offices near the United Nations, with American federalist Marion McVitty as the Movement's UN observer and advocate.

Some federalists in this period focused on amendments to the United Nations Charter as a way forward. Most involved reforms to institutions such as a more representative Security Council, a World Court with compulsory jurisdiction and judicial review authority and a democratically elected General Assembly (or a world parliament). Federalists proposed a number of new institutions such as a commission on sustainable development, an international development authority, a standing peacekeeping corps and an international criminal court.

Serving many of the existing world federalist organizations, an International Secretariat and a research oriented Institute for Global Policy, the World Federalist Movement – Institute for Global Policy was established in the 1990s in New York City, across from the headquarters of the United Nations. It hosts the Coalition for the International Criminal Court, the International Coalition for the Responsibility to Protect and serves as an steering committee member in the 1 For 7 Billion coalition. It has had Special Consultative Status with the United Nations Economic and Social Council (ECOSOC) since 1970 and is affiliated with the UN Department of Public Information (DPI) and a current board member of the Conference of NGOs (CONGO). The Institute for Global Policy (IGP), founded in 1983 as its research arm is a research and policy institute dedicated to the promotion of human security, international justice, the prevention of armed conflict and the protection of civilians. The Institute emphasizes the democratization of international and regional organizations and the development and global application of international law. Most recently, WFM-IGP has been at the forefront of advocating for NGO access to international conferences and meetings.

Structure
The World Federalist Movement-Institute for Global Policy serves as a New York hub and secretariat for world federalist organizations.

World Federalist Movement is composed of autonomous national and regional organizations organized by individual supporters in their respective countries. In applying to the governing Council for membership, organizations are asked to endorse the "Statutes of the World Federalist Movement" and to demonstrate a "capacity to contribute to the enhancement of public and political support" for the Movement's goals.

World Federalist Organizations exist around the world, including Citizens for Global Solutions, Union of European Federalists, World Federalist Movement-Canada, and the World Federalist Movement of Japan. Others include the Young World Federalists, the Democratic World Federalists, One World Trust, Democracy Without Borders, and the Ugandan World Federalists. The WFM umbrella organization also includes the Coalition for the International Criminal Court and the International Coalition for the Responsibility to Protect.

See also

 World Federalism
 Citizens for Global Solutions
 Committee for a Democratic UN
 Democratic World Federalists
 Global citizenship
 Global union
 One World Trust
 Union of European Federalists
 United Nations Parliamentary Assembly
 World Federalist Movement-Canada

References

External links
World Federalist Movement-Institute for Global Policy
Union of European Federalists
The Federalist Debate
Reform the UN
Responsibility to Protect – Engaging Civil Society (R2PCS)
Campaign for World Government. Records of the New York Office, 1917-1972 Manuscripts and Archives, New York Public Library.
Campaign for World Government. Records of the Chicago Office, 1937-2000 Manuscripts and Archives, New York Public Library.
Young World Federalists

International nongovernmental organizations
World federalist movement member organizations
World government
Organizations established in 1947
1947 establishments in New York (state)
Organizations based in New York City
International organizations based in the United States